The Monte Tchota  massacre was a mass shooting that occurred at the Monte Tchota army barracks in Cape Verde in the early hours of 25 April 2016.

Massacre 
Between the hours of 9:30 and 10:00 in the morning, a rogue FACV soldier identified as 23-year old Manuel Antonio Silva Ribeiro, opened fire at the Monte Tchota army barracks, 27 km (17 miles) north of Praia, the capital of Cape Verde. The shooting occurred as the soldiers were helping to repair antennas at the top of the hill near the barracks. Ribeiro opened fire on his fellow soldiers, shooting eight to death. In the aftermath of the shootings, Ribeiro killed three technicians, two Spanish and a local Cape Verdean, who stopped him from leaving in a getaway car. Eight Kalashnikov rifles and ammunition were stolen from the dead soldiers and later discovered in the abandoned car nearby. The bodies were discovered 24 hours later by a police officer.

Victims 
The FACV soldiers killed were Nelson Neide de Brito, of Brava island, Romario Steffan Dias Lima, of St. Anthony island, Anacleto Lopes dos Santos, of St. Anthony island, Marilson Adérito Fernandes Delgado, of Santiago island, Mario Stanick Fernandes Pereira, of Santiago island, José Maria Correia Ribeiro, of Santiago island, Wilson Ramos Mendes, of Santiago island, and Adérito Silva Rocha, of Santiago island.

The dead civilians were Danielson Reis Monteiro (Cape Verde), Angelo Martinez Ruiz, and David Sanches Zamarreno (Spain).

Arrests 
Ribeiro was arrested in a joint operation by judicial police and the military two days later in a neighborhood of the capital of Praia.

In response to the incident President Jorge Carlos Fonseca said a personal feud was behind the killings, ruling out an attempted coup or links to the drug trade.

On November 4, 2016, Manuel António Silva Ribeiro was sentenced to 35 years in prison - the maximum sentence available under Cape Verdean law.

References 

2016 in Cape Verde
Military of Cape Verde
Mass murder in 2016
Mass shootings in Africa
Crime in Cape Verde